Sanjay Singh may refer to:
Sanjay Singh (Uttar Pradesh politician) AAP politician and Rajya Sabha MP active in UP
Sanjay Singh (Haryana politician) BJP MLA in Haryana
Sanjay Singh (squash player) (born 1994), Malaysian squash player
Sanjay Singh Chauhan (born 1961), Uttar Pradesh politician
Sanjay Singh Gangwar, Uttar Pradesh politician 
Sanjay Singh Tiger (born 1974), Bihar politician
Sanjay Singh Yadav, writer
Sanjaya Sinh (born 1951), Uttar Pradesh politician